Iron Ring is an American reality television series and mixed martial arts (MMA) competition that aired on BET.

Format
On this show, professional MMA fighters that have yet to make a big name for themselves were selected onto teams representing five different weight classes (Heavyweight, Middleweight, and Lightweight [which the show contested at 170lbs rather than 155lbs]).

Each team had a celebrity owner and MMA coach who evaluated the try outs and selected contestants.  Team owners included boxing champ Floyd Mayweather and Rick Ross managing the Money Mayweather Boys; hip-hop artist Ludacris with Team Luda; Nelly representing Team Nelly; T.I. leading Team Grand Hustle; Juelz Santana and Jim Jones heading Dipset; and Lil Jon with the Head Busters.  Featured MMA coaches included Shonie Carter and Charles Bennett.

The respective teams then fought over the course of several weeks, building towards a finale that took place in New Orleans in February 2008.

Winner
The winners of each weight class included:

 Heavyweight: Abongo Humphrey
 Middleweight: Jamie Yager
 Lightweight (170lbs): Josh Gaskins

The ultimate team winner was Team Nelly.

References

External links
 

2000s American reality television series
2008 American television series debuts
2008 American television series endings
Mixed martial arts television shows
BET original programming